Baltimore Orioles F.C. were a soccer club based in Baltimore, Maryland. The club was formed in 1893 and in 1895 the club folded. They were sponsored by the early professional baseball circuit, the National League with their 19th Century Baltimore Orioles baseball club, who were then famous for winning three League championships in a row: 1894, 1895, and 1896. The "Orioles" soccer/football club played in the short-lived league of the American League of Professional Football.

Defunct soccer clubs in Maryland
Orioles
Baltimore Orioles
1893 establishments in Maryland
1895 disestablishments in Maryland
Association football clubs established in 1893
Association football clubs disestablished in 1895